Sloatsburg is a village in the town of Ramapo in Rockland County, New York, United States. Located east of Orange County, it is at the southern entrance to Harriman State Park. The population was 3,039 at the 2010 census. The village is named after Stephen Sloat, an early European landowner.

History
The land that would become the village of Sloatsburg was part of the hunting grounds of the Minsi band of the Leni Lenape Indians, whose people occupied much of the mid-Atlantic area at the time of European encounter. The area was the site of a major Indian path through the Ramapo Mountains. The path was later improved as the New York to Albany road and, in 1800, the Orange Turnpike. It remains an important thoroughfare today as the New York State Thruway, New York State Route 17 and the Norfolk Southern Railway line run along its route.

Wynant Van Gelder, an ethnic Dutch colonist, purchased the area from the Minsi in 1738. In 1747, he gave it to his father-in-law, Isaac Van Deusen.  When his daughter Marritge Van Deusen married Stephen Sloat, Isaac gave the couple the land in 1763. They built a stone house on the property and operated a tavern, which was a regular stop on the New York-to-Albany stage route. During the American Revolution, the Sloat House was headquarters for American troops stationed in the Ramapo Pass. The house is a private residence, listed on the National Register of Historic Places. There he established Sloat's Tavern, which became a regular stop on the New York to Albany stage route.

Sloatsburg, originally Pothat, was named after the Sloat family. During the American Revolutionary War, the stage route became an important military route and the Ramapo pass an important strategic point, occupied by American troops throughout the war. George Washington traveled through the area several times and stayed in Sloat's Tavern at least once, on June 6, 1779.

After the war, the Sloats added a tannery and a cotton mill. One of the sons, Jacob Sloat, was a gifted mechanic. He opened a mill in 1815 for making cotton cloth, importing cotton from the South. He successfully turned to making exclusively cotton twine after patenting a process for dressing it in 1840. The family operated the mill until the Civil War, when it close temporarily for lack of cotton. It was one of numerous mills near New York City that produced cotton textiles; in 1860 half the exports from New York were cotton products. The mill ceased operations in 1878, after the South developed its own textile mills.

In the early 19th century, Abram Dater built an iron forge on the Ramapo River, and a grist mill and a saw mill soon followed. Between 1836 and 1841, the Erie Railroad built a line through Sloatsburg, resulting in a major increase in the population and prosperity of the village. After the Civil War, the village prospered until the great flood of 1903 destroyed most of the factories in the town. First built close to the river for its water power, many were never rebuilt.

During Prohibition, Sloatsburg's rural setting and proximity to New York City made it an attractive location for stills and bootlegging; the gangsters running the operations also occasionally used the local woods to dispose of bodies of those killed in the course of business. In 1929, with a population of 1,559, Sloatsburg was incorporated as a village, with David Henion elected as the first mayor.

The rise of the automobile early in the 20th century had a profound impact on the area. Prior to construction of the New York State Thruway and the Palisades Parkway in the 1950s, Sloatsburg was cut in half by automobile traffic, which could back up for miles in the 1940s and 1950s on the Orange Turnpike.

Geography

The western part of the village borders Orange County.

Demographics

As of the census of 2000, there were 3,117 people, 1,046 households, and 826 families residing in the village. The population density was 1,162.0 people per square mile (449.1/km2). There were 1,078 housing units at an average density of 401.9 per square mile (155.3/km2). The racial makeup of the village was 90.95% White, 3.53% African American, 0.45% Native American, 2.50% Asian, 0.10% Pacific Islander, 0.93% from other races, and 1.54% from two or more races. Hispanic or Latino of any race were 5.58% of the population.

There were 1,046 households, out of which 38.5% had children under the age of 18 living with them, 63.6% were married couples living together, 10.4% had a female householder with no husband present, and 21.0% were non-families. Of all households, 15.9% were made up of individuals, and 5.7% had someone living alone who was 65 years of age or older. The average household size was 2.91 and the average family size was 3.27.

In the village, the population was spread out, with 26.1% under the age of 18, 7.0% from 18 to 24, 31.1% from 25 to 44, 24.2% from 45 to 64, and 11.6% who were 65 years of age or older. The median age was 37 years. For every 100 females, there were 99.6 males. For every 100 females age 18 and over, there were 93.3 males.

The median income for a household in the village was $70,721, and the median income for a family was $78,529. Males had a median income of $51,549 versus $39,464 for females. The per capita income for the village was $27,180. About 0.8% of families and 3.0% of the population were below the poverty line, including 1.5% of those under age 18 and 3.4% of those age 65 or over.

Education 
Sloatsburg lies within the Suffern Central School District.  Sloatsburg Elementary School serves the village, students in grades 6-8 are zoned to Suffern Middle School, and older students are zoned to Suffern High School.

Transportation

Sloatsburg station provides Metro-North train service on the Port Jervis Line to Hoboken - where connecting PATH train service is available to New York and Jersey City - and to Secaucus, the connecting point to New York Penn Station and points in New Jersey. In the opposite direction, the line goes to Port Jervis. Sloatsburg is the western terminus for Transport of Rockland's bus line number 93.

New York State Route 17 travels through Sloatsburg as Orange Turnpike. Interstate 87, the New York State Thruway, passes through Sloatsburg, but there is no direct access from the Thruway to other roads in Sloatsburg. Seven Lakes Drive through Harriman State Park has its southern terminus in Sloatsburg.

Notable people

 John Drake Sloat, (July 6, 1781 – November 28, 1867) was a commodore in the United States Navy who, in 1846, claimed California for the United States and became the 1st Military Governor of California.
 Robert H. Gittins, former US Congressman
 Scott Wright, professional wrestler and bodybuilder, known as "Scotty Charisma".

Historic landmarks
Four properties in Sloatsburg, all associated with the Sloat family, have been listed on the National Register of Historic Places. There are some other sites of historical interest in the village.

 The Glenwood Hotel, est. 1908, was owned and operated by Henry and Kathleen Tobin. For 50 years it was a favorite dinner stop for many travelers en route to upstate New York, Vermont, and Canada, prior to the opening of the New York State Thruway. Wealthy patrons from nearby Tuxedo Park were also regulars at the Glenwood. The upper floors operated as a boarding house for workers in the mills of Sloatsburg until 1950. In 1998, the building was preserved and restored to its original appearance.
 Old Sloatsburg Cemetery, has 1700 gravesites, 1400 marked with headstones. The earliest burial was Private John Sloat, 1781, during Revolutionary War. It is a settlement-era burial ground associated with the development of Sloatsburg, including the Sloat Family Burial Ground. (NRHP)
 Sloatsburg Historical Society - includes a display of Lenape and other Native American artifacts
 Sloatsburg Public Library - Permanent exhibit of prehistoric artifacts excavated from the Spring House Rock Shelter in Sloatsburg. Artifacts date back thousands of years. Library building originally housed the St. Francis Episcopal Church, itself once a mission chapel of St. Mary's-in-Tuxedo Episcopal Church.
 Sloat House & Inn, a stone house dating to the mid-18th century. It served as a meeting place for local politicians and officials during the Revolution, and was home to Sloat family members for many years. (NRHP) 
 Sloat's Dam and Mill Pond. Only remaining dam on this stretch of the Ramapo River, originally built by Isaac Sloat in 1792. (NRHP) 
 Jacob Sloat House, (Harmony Hall) 15 Liberty Rock Road. 1848 mansion transitions from Greek Revival to Picturesque. Possibly co-designed by Sloat's friend, painter and occasional architect Jasper Cropsey. The Town of Ramapo and Friends of Harmony Hall-Jacob Sloat House have been working together since 2006 to restore the mansion for future use as a regional cultural center. It is estimated that as much as 95 percent of the 1848 footprint of the house has survived. Harmony Hall was listed on the State and National Register of Historic Places in 2006. (NRHP)

General sources 
 Bartlett, Ted, Historic Structure Report for Harmony Hall/Jacob Sloat House, Crawford & Stearns Architects and Preservation Planners, 2008.
 Kuykendall, Eugene L., Historic Sloatsburg, 1738-1998: The Way It Was, Is and Can Be, Sloatsburg Historical Society, 1998.

Citations

External links

 Village of Sloatsburg official website 
 Historical Markers and War Memorials in Sloatsburg, New York
 Sloatsburg history

Ramapos
Villages in New York (state)
Villages in Rockland County, New York